Sonin may refer to:

People
 Sonin (regent) (1601–1667), regent in China during the Qing Dynasty
 Aleksandr Sonin (born 1983), Russian professional football player
 David Sonin (1935–2008), music critic and arts journalist
 Konstantin Sonin (born 1972), Russian economist
 Nikolay Yakovlevich Sonin (1849–1915), Russian mathematician
 Ray Sonin (1907–1991), English-born Canadian broadcaster
 Yevhen Sonin (born 1974), former Ukrainian football player
 Sonim (born 1983),  (born 1983), Korean-Japanese singer

Other
 Loprazolam, an anti-insomnia drug marketed under the name "Sonin"
 Sonin polynomials, a form of Laguerre polynomials
 "Sonin", a variant of the name Sonia